Puerto Rico Highway 567 (PR-567) is a north–south rural road located between the municipalities of Orocovis and Morovis, Puerto Rico. It extends from its junction with PR-157 on the Barros–Damián Arriba line in Orocovis, passing through Vaga, Pasto and San Lorenzo barrios until its end at its intersection with PR-145 and PR-6622 in the Torrecillas–Morovis Norte line in Morovis.

Major intersections

Related route

Puerto Rico Highway 5567 (PR-5567) is a spur route located in Morovis. It extends from PR-567 on the Pasto–Vaga line to Vaga barrio.

See also

 List of highways numbered 567

References

External links

 Develan puente ‘La Esperanza’ en Morovis 

567